Osieczyna  is a settlement, part of the village of Godków, in the administrative district of Gmina Kostomłoty, within Środa Śląska County, Lower Silesian Voivodeship, in south-western Poland.

Transport
The Polish A4 motoway runs nearby, north of Osieczyna.

References

Osieczna